The Llano del Hato National Astronomical Observatory (code: 303) is an astronomical observatory in Venezuela. It is 3600 meters above sea level and is the country's main observatory. It is situated above the village of Llano del Hato in the Venezuelan Andes, not far from Apartaderos which lies about 50 kilometers north-east of Mérida, Mérida State.

Description 

This facility is the closest major optical observatory to the equator lying at 8 degrees and 47.51 minutes north. It therefore has access to most parts of both the northern and southern skies. It benefits from a very dark site, and its altitude of 3,600 meters (12,000 feet) above sea level means atmospheric turbulence is greatly reduced.

The observatory is under the auspices of the Centro de Investigaciones de Astronomia (CIDA), the main astronomical research body in Venezuela. CIDA conducts many projects in collaboration with other research organizations, academic institutions and international bodies. It also conducts valuable research in its own right and has a record that includes several important discoveries.

There are four large optical telescopes, each in its own cupola or dome: a 1-m Askania Schmidt camera (one of the largest telescopes of this type in the world), a 65-cm Zeiss refractor, a 1-m Zeiss reflector and a 50-cm Askania double astrograph. These instruments were acquired by the Venezuelan government 1954 and installed at Llano del Hato in  early 1955. The observatory also has a museum and exhibition centre where visitors can learn about the work of the observatory and CIDA as well as astronomy in general.

The Quasar Equatorial Survey Team (QUEST) project is a joint venture between Yale University, Indiana University, and CIDA to photographically survey the sky. It now uses the 48 inch (1.22-m) aperture Samuel Oschin telescope at the Palomar Observatory with a digital camera, an array of 112 charge-coupled devices. Previously, it used the 1.0-metre Schmidt telescope of the Llano del Hato National Astronomical Observatory.

List of discovered minor planets 

At OAN de Llano del Hato, Mérida, a total of 50 minor planets have been discovered and credited to the astronomers Orlando Naranjo, Jürgen Stock, Ignacio Ferrín and Carlos Leal:

References

External links 

 Information about the observatory from CIDA 
 Llano del Hato Automatic Weather Station

Astronomical observatories in Venezuela
Buildings and structures in Mérida (state)
Minor-planet discovering observatories